The  Bowersville Historic District in Bowersville, Georgia is a historic district which was listed on the National Register of Historic Places in 1985.

It included Late Victorian architecture and other architecture.

References

Historic districts on the National Register of Historic Places in Georgia (U.S. state)
Victorian architecture in Georgia (U.S. state)
Hart County, Georgia
National Register of Historic Places in Hart County, Georgia